Herminia vermiculata is a litter moth of the family Erebidae first described by John Henry Leech in 1900. It is found in western China and Taiwan.

References

Herminiinae
Moths described in 1900